Patrick D. Miller, Jr. (24 October 1935 – 1 May 2020) was an American Old Testament scholar who served as Charles T. Haley Professor of Old Testament Theology at Princeton Theological Seminary from 1984 to 2005. He was an ordained minister in the Presbyterian Church (U.S.A.).

Miller studied at Davidson College, Union Theological Seminary in Virginia, and Harvard University. He taught at Union from 1966 to 1984, and at Princeton from 1984 to 2005.

Miller served as editor of Theology Today, and, in 1998, as president of the Society of Biblical Literature.

In 2003, a Festschrift was published in his honor. A God So Near: Essays on Old Testament Theology in Honor of Patrick D. Miller included contributions from Walter Brueggemann, Frank Moore Cross, and Hugh G. M. Williamson.

Miller died on 1 May 2020 after a long illness.

Works

Books

As editor

References

1935 births
2020 deaths
Princeton Theological Seminary faculty
Academic journal editors
Old Testament scholars
American Presbyterian ministers
American biblical scholars
Davidson College alumni
Union Presbyterian Seminary alumni
Union Presbyterian Seminary faculty
Harvard University alumni
Bible commentators